North Carolina Highway 904 (NC 904) is a primary state highway in the U.S. state of North Carolina. The highway parallels the North Carolina-South Carolina border as it connects Fair Bluff, Tabor City, Sunset Beach, and Ocean Isle Beach.

Description
It passes through Brunswick, Columbus, and Robeson Counties.

History

Established in 1937 as a renumbering of NC 761 when it was extended into South Carolina, south of Tabor City, continuing as SC 904. Around 1951, US 701 was rerouted at Tabor City, replacing NC 904 into South Carolina; its former alignment became an extension of NC 410. In 1954, NC 904 was extended west on new primary routing to its current western terminus with NC 130 in Five Forks. By 1958, NC 904 was extended onto new primary routing east to Seaside; by 1963, it was extended again to its current eastern terminus in Ocean Isle Beach.

North Carolina Highway 761

North Carolina Highway 761 (NC 761) was established 1935 as new primary routing from US 76 in Fair Bluff, to US 701 in Tabor City. In 1937, it was renumbered as NC 904 when the highway was extended into South Carolina to sync with SC 904.

Major intersections

References

External links

NCRoads.com: N.C. 761
NCRoads.com: N.C. 904

904
Transportation in Robeson County, North Carolina
Transportation in Columbus County, North Carolina
Transportation in Brunswick County, North Carolina